Mägara Stream is a stream in Toila Parish, Ida-Viru County. The river is 15.8 km long and basin size is 36 km². It runs into Pühajõgi.

The stream is known mainly because of its Aluoja Cascades. The cascades are located in Pühajõe village. Height of cascades are (moving downriver): 1.4 m, 0.7 m, 1.9 m, 1.3 m and 0.5 m.

References

Rivers of Estonia
Toila Parish